Deborah Oluwaseyi Joshua (born Oluwaseyi Joshua;  21 December 1985), known professionally as Seyi Shay (pronounced Shay-yee Shay), is a Nigerian singer, songwriter and actress. In 2008, she became the lead singer for the now defunct pop girl group From Above. The group signed a recording deal with Sony's Columbia Records and was managed by Mathew Knowles' Music World Entertainment company. In November 2013, Shay signed an endorsement deal with telecommunications service provider Etisalat. In July 2015, she signed a record deal with Island Records. In 2015, she signed a two-year endorsement deal with Pepsi. Shay released her debut studio album Seyi or Shay in November 2015. It was supported by the promotional singles "Irawo", "Ragga Ragga", "Right Now" and "Murda", featuring Patoranking and Shaydee. In January 2021, she signed a publishing deal with the French division of Universal Music Publishing Group

Life and career

1985–2010: Early life, career beginnings, songwriting, and record deal with Flytime
Oluwaseyi Joshua was born and raised in Tottenham, London, England, to Nigerian parents. Her mother was from Northern Nigeria and her father is a native of Ife. She has two elder brothers and an elder sister. She and her siblings were raised by their single mother. Shay grew up in a Christian home. She often felt like a single child during her adolescence as she is the single child between her mother and father. She started visiting Nigeria when she was two years old, and eventually attended the Command High School in Maryland, Lagos. She went back to London to complete her undergraduate studies, where she also attended and graduated from the University of East London, with a BA Hons in Music business management. Her interest in music was influenced by members of her household. Her late mother was a chorister and her sister used to compose songs for the BBC and her brother was a prominent club and radio DJ in London. Shay joined her secondary school choir and started performing at the age of 6. She performed for the London Community Gospel Choir during their world tour, which included 13 cities in Japan. In an interview with Lanre Odukoya of Thisday, Shay said that her mother wasn't a staunch supporter of her musical ambitions. Moreover, her mother wanted her to become a doctor or lawyer. Prior to departing the Earth, her mother told her to focus on her music career and put God first.

Her music career took an upswing when she signed her first ever record deal with No Apologies, a record company affiliated with Sir George Martin (commonly referred to as the "Fifth Beatle"). In 2006, Shay formed a girl band in the UK called Boadicea; they were managed by Ron Tom, the founder and manager of All Saints and Sugababes. The band separated after two years, and Shay decided to partake in the From Above UK singing audition. After the conclusion of the audition, she emerged as the lead vocalist for the now defunct girl group From Above. The group inked a record deal with Mathew Knowles' management company after performing for him. They were taken to Houston to undergo energetic vocal and dance trainings. The group supported Beyoncé while she was in the UK for her I Am... World Tour. They presented the Best New Act award to Bruno Mars at the 2011 MTV Europe Music Awards and had their own MTV reality show called Breaking From Above, which aired in over 166 countries around the world. The group later disassembled and Shay had an opportunity to continue her management deal with Mathew Knowles, as well as secure a recording contract with Sony. Instead, she made a decision to join Fly time Music after getting an offer from them. Shay has worked with a number of musicians, including Justin Timberlake, Brian Michael Cox, Darey, Bilal, Michelle Williams, Chip, Rob Knoxx, H-Money, and Cameron Wallace.

She wrote and produced three songs for the soundtrack to Konami's video game Crime Life: Gang Wars (2005). She also wrote "You Will See", a song that was included on Melanie C's third studio album Beautiful Intentions (2005). Shay wrote "White Lies", a song from Chip's Transition album. 

Shay was introduced to Sound Sultan during her visit to London in 2011. After listening to some of her demos, Sultan convinced her to relocate to Nigeria and pursue a musical career there. In addition to meeting Sultan, Shay was introduced to Cecil Hammond of Flytime Promotions. Hammond signed her to his record label Flytime Music and decided to launch her solo career in Nigeria. In 2013, Shay left Flytime Music and told Vanguard newspaper that she had joined the label to promote her brand. She also said that while signed to the record label, she was very much in control of her brand. Moreover, she said she still has a relationship with the label.

2011–2019: Seyi or Shay, Electric Package, notable performances, and concert residency 

Shay released her debut studio album Seyi or Shay in November 2015. Work on the album started as early as 2013. Shay worked with several producers in Nigeria, including Jay Sleek, Tee Y Mix, Del B and Cobhams Asuquo. On 11 August 2011, she released "Loving Your Way" and "No Le Le", two promotional singles that helped launched her singing career in Nigeria.

On 27 July 2012, Shay released "Irawo" as the album's lead single. The song was produced by Del B and was originally titled "Erawo". During the aforementioned interview with Ajose, Shay said she wrote "Irawo" to inspire her colleagues and workmates to pull together. The music video for the song was shot and directed in Nigeria by Clarence Peters. It was uploaded onto YouTube on 3 June 2013, at a total length of 3 minutes and 47 seconds. The remix of "Irawo" features rap verses from Vector and was released on 6 December 2012.

Shay performed at the 2013 COSON song awards. In May 2013, Shay told Lanre Odukoya of This Day newspaper that she recorded a single with Olamide. She said that working with him was easy because of their work ethic. She also told Odukoya the song was written by Olamide and would be released in 2014. Shay has been featured on the records of several promising artists, including Praiz, Mr. Walz, Yung Grey C and Amir. In July 2013, she performed at one of Big Brother Africa 8's live eviction shows. On 20 July 2013, she performed in Asaba for the 2013 edition of Star Music Trek. In August 2013, Shay released the Timaya-assisted track "Killin' Me Softly", as album's second single. It was written and produced by Del B. Shay told Ajose she felt in love with the song when she first heard it, and reached out to Timaya for a verse because she wanted a different vibe on the song. On 27 September 2013, Shay graced the stage at the Sisters with Soul concert, which was headlined by Mary J. Blige. 

On 6 October 2013, Shay released "Ragga Ragga" and "Chairman" as the third and fourth singles from the album. Both songs were produced by Del B. The latter track features vocals by Kcee, who was present during the song's composition. Prior to releasing the two singles, Shay signed a partnership deal with the international talent company J-Management. On 20 November 2013, she performed "Bad" with Wale at the Johnnie Walker Step Up to VIP Lifestyle Launch event (held at the Oriental Hotel, Victoria Island, Lagos). Shay was a supporting act on the 2013 Hennessy Artistry 2013 Club. In December 2013, she performed at the Harp Rhythm Unplugged concert.

On 8 January 2014, Shay released the music video for "Ragga Ragga"; it was shot and directed in Lagos by Peters. "Ragga Ragga" peaked at number 7 on MTV Base's Official Naija Top 10 chart from 15 March through 19 March 2014. On 15 February 2014, Shay performed with Kelly Rowland, D'banj, Tiwa Savage, Mo' Eazy, Zaina, Timi Dakolo, Waje, Muna, JJC and Eva Alordiah at Darey's Love Like A Movie concert. On 22 April 2016, she released music video of Pack and Go, off her debut album Seyi or Shay, featuring Olamide.

On 1 April 2014, Shay released the Dokta Frabz-produced single "Murda". The song features additional vocals from Patoranking and Shaydee. Aribaba of Jaguda gave the song 9 out 10 stars, stating: "The use of familiar lyrics don't know what you've got till it's gone makes the first time listening experience even more enjoyable." On 11 May 2014, the music video for "Murda" was uploaded onto Vevo. It was directed by Meji Alabi for JM Films. The song Murda made its way to the UK charting at number 8 on BBC 1 xtra charts, this was also  the first time Shays music would be play listed on radio in the uk.

On 10 January 2017, she released the critically acclaimed debut single Yolo Yolo produced by DJ Coublon. On 20 March 2017, the music video was released and directed by Meji Alabi. The video was nominated at the 12th edition of The Headies for Best Music Video. The record "Yolo Yolo", became Baileys commercial sound track for west and Sub-Saharan Africa. In 2019, Shay released Gimme Love, a record featuring Runtown, and she won the Best R&B Single at the 13th edition of The Headies. Later that year, in December, she released the remix and video to Gimme Love, featuring Teyana Taylor.

In March 2019, Shay announced on Instagram that she had been given a concert residency in the United Kingdom. The 2-night residency at the Biosdale of Canary Wharf in London was billed to hold on 29 and 30 May 2019.

2020–present: Nigerian Idol, Aristokrat Group, and Universal Music France
On 2 February 2021, MultiChoice Nigeria, unveil Seyi Shay, as one of the three judges of Nigerian Idol season 6, through DStv official website. In March 2021, during the audition, she was criticized on Twitter by Nigerians for her remarks on Mayowa “Torrus” Odueyungbo, a 17-years-old singer, over his stage performances. On 29 March 2021, Frank Edoho, called out all judges of the show, as trash over her remark on Torrus. She responded to the trend with a tweet, in quote "I’m feeling like #JudgeJudy right now. You either love her or you hate her, and that’s quite alright! either way, thanks for the #1 trend tweeps 😘".

On 7 June 2020, Piriye Isokrari unveiled Seyi Shay, as one of the females artists signed to Aristokrat Records, management division Aristokrat 360. In 2021, she signed a publishing deal with Universal Music Publishing, France division, and Aristokrat Publishing, following the jointed partnership between Universal Music France, and The Aristokrat Group.

Artistry and role models 
Although her musical style is primarily a combination of Afropop and R&B, Shay doesn't conform to a particular genre of music. She believes that her musical prowess covers different genres, and has stated that her music draws from things that inspire her. Shay has cited her mother, Mathew Knowles, 2face Idibia, Beyoncé, Tina Turner, Sound Sultan, Wizkid, and Omawumi as mentors.

Discography

Albums 
Seyi or Shay (2015)
Big Girl (2021)

EPs 
Electric Package (2018)

Selected singles

Selected videography

Filmography

Awards and nominations

Notes

References

External links

Living people
1985 births
Nigerian women musicians
Yoruba women musicians
Nigerian women pop singers
Nigerian women singer-songwriters
Nigerian rhythm and blues singer-songwriters
21st-century Nigerian women singers
Alumni of the University of East London
Musicians from London
English people of Nigerian descent
English people of Yoruba descent
English-language singers from Nigeria
Yoruba-language singers
Nigerian reggae singers
Island Records artists
Yoruba actresses
Nigerian film actresses
Universal Music France artists